Rally Credit Union (formerly known as Navy Army Community Credit Union and Navy Army Federal Credit Union) is a credit union headquartered in Corpus Christi, Texas, chartered and regulated under the authority of the Texas Credit Union Department of the U.S. federal government.  NavyArmy is the largest credit union in the coastal bend.  As of September 2020, Rally has over $3.5 billion USD in assets, and over 196,000 members.

History 
Rally was chartered on January 28, 1955, as Naval Employees Corpus Christi Federal Credit Union. Only employees from the Naval Air Station Corpus Christi were eligible to join. In 2003, the credit union changed its charter to open membership to all residents of the Coastal Bend. Over the years, through careful management, outstanding customer service and supportive membership, Rally has grown to become the largest credit union in the Corpus Christi area. In 2012 NavyArmy opened two locations in the Rio Grande Valley, the first in McAllen Texas and the second in Brownsville Texas. In early 2023, the credit union announced it would be transitioning to its new name Rally Credit Union.

Membership 
Rally's field of membership is set by the Texas Credit Union Department.  As with all credit unions, membership in NavyArmy is limited to individuals sharing the common bond defined in its credit union charter.  Membership in Rally is limited to all people, businesses and/or legal entities who live, work, worship and/or go to school in Aransas, Bee, Cameron, Hidalgo, Jim Wells, Kleberg, Nueces, and San Patricio counties.

Organization 
Rally is chartered with Texas Credit Union Department as a community credit union.  Like all credit unions, NavyArmy is governed by a board of volunteers, elected by and from its membership.

In the summer of 2011 the board of NavyArmy proposed changing from a federal charter to a State of Texas charter. This change would provide Rally the opportunity to expand into additional geographic areas of Texas.

Services 
Rally offers a suite of account services offered by most financial institutions, including savings accounts, checking accounts, IRA accounts, and CDs.  The savings product is named "Share Savings" to reflect the fact that a member's initial savings deposit ($15) literally represents their share of ownership in the credit union.  NavyArmy also offers members consumer loans, mortgages and home equity lines of credit, as well as small business services.

Rally has 17 branches and over 500 ATMs, located in its Coastal Bend and Rio Grande Valley service area and in hundreds of Stripes convenience stores in Texas and Oklahoma. They offer extensive online services via its corporate website.

References

Credit unions based in Texas
Companies based in Corpus Christi, Texas
Banks established in 1955
United States Navy
1955 establishments in Texas